This list of railway stations in North Rhine-Westphalia includes the most important passenger stations operated by the Deutsche Bahn in North Rhine-Westphalia, based on the DB's railway station categories.

Passenger stations not mentioned here are in the lowest categories, 6 or 7.

See also
German railway station categories
Railway station types of Germany
List of scheduled railway routes in Germany

References

External links 
 Online timetable of DB services

 
North Rhine-Westphalia
Rail